The University of Economics in Bratislava is the oldest university of economics in Slovakia.

History

The university was established in 1940 as a private university under the name Vysoká obchodná škola v Bratislave (College of Commerce in Bratislava), to serve Slovak students because of the closure of colleges and universities in the German-occupied Protectorate of Bohemia and Moravia. It was nationalized in 1945 and renamed to Slovenská vysoká škola obchodná (Slovak College of Commerce). It was renamed in 1949 to Vysoká škola hospodárskych vied (College of Business / Economic Sciences) and once again in 1952 to Vysoká škola ekonomická (College of Economics). The current name has been used since 1992.

University Board 
Prof. Ing. Ferdinand Daňo, PhD. – Rector of the University of Economics in Bratislava
Assoc. Prof. Mgr. Boris Mattoš, PhD. – Statutory Representative of the Rector and Vice-Rector for International Relations
Assoc. Prof. Mgr. Ing. Zuzana Juhászová, PhD. – Vice-Rector for Education
Assoc. Prof. Ing. Paula Puškárová, DiS. art., Ph.D. – Vice-Rector for Research and Doctoral Studies
Assoc. Prof. Ing. Jana Péliová, PhD. – Vice-Rector for Management of Academic Projects
Dr.h.c. Prof. Ing. Rudolf Sivák, PhD. – Vice-Rector for Development
Ing. Mária Dziurová – Head of the University Administration and Finance

Structure

 Faculty of National Economy
 Faculty of Commerce
 Faculty of Economic Informatics
 Faculty of Business Management
 Faculty of International Relations
 Faculty of Applied Languages
 Faculty of Business Economy with seat in Košice

References

 
Educational institutions established in 1940
Education in Bratislava
1940 establishments in Slovakia